J. Chinchu Rani is an Indian politician from Kollam, Kerala. She is currently serving as Minister for Animal Husbandry, Dairy Development, Milk Co-operatives, Zoos, Kerala Veterinary & Animal Sciences University, Government of Kerala; represents  Chadayamangalam constituency in 15th Kerala Legislative Assembly since May 2021.

Personal life 
She was born to Mundakkal Bharanikkavu Thekkevilayil Veliyil Vadakkathil N. Sreedharan and Jagadamma. Her father was an early communist activist and cashew workers union member. Her husband D. Sukeshan is CPI Anchaalummoodu Mandalam Secretary and District Secretary of Library Council. They have two children, Nandu Sukeshan and Nandana Rani.

Political career
She is a member of the CPI National Council and a member of the CPI State Executive. In addition, she also holds the positions of Kerala Mahila Sangam State President, Poultry Corporation Chairperson and President of Achutha Menon Co-operative Hospital.

References 

Kerala MLAs 2021–2026
Communist Party of India politicians from Kerala
Female politicians of the Communist Party of India
Politicians from Kollam
Year of birth missing (living people)
Living people
21st-century Indian women politicians
Women members of the Kerala Legislative Assembly